Central Plaza is a 23-storey,  skyscraper at 455 Market and First streets in San Francisco, California.

Tenants
ACE Group

See also
 San Francisco's tallest buildings

References

Skyscraper office buildings in San Francisco
Financial District, San Francisco
Market Street (San Francisco)
Kaplan McLaughlin Diaz buildings
Office buildings completed in 1987